Destruction by Definition is the debut album by the Detroit, Michigan punk rock band The Suicide Machines, released in 1996 by Hollywood Records. It was the band's first full-length album and established their presence in the mid-1990s punk rock mainstream revival alongside the third wave ska movement. The album's musical style blends elements of hardcore punk and ska, which contributed to the band's style being described as ska punk or "skacore." Music videos were filmed for the singles "No Face" and "S.O.S.," with "No Face" reaching #31 on Billboard's Modern Rock charts while "New Girl" was featured on the Tony Hawk's Pro Skater soundtrack, alongside “No Face” and “S.O.S.” being featured in the soundtrack for the PlayStation fighting game Vs. “Break The Glass” was also featured in the soundtrack to the film An American Werewolf in Paris.

To promote the album several promotional clips were created featuring footage from a show at St. Andrew’s Hall in February of 1996 mixed with skateboarding footage. The songs featured were “New Girl”, “S.O.S.”, and “Break The Glass”. The album’s title was decided by Navarro, and it basically refers to the fact that if you place a label on something you destroy it since the band didn’t like being labeled as a ska band.

Track listing
All songs written by The Suicide Machines except where noted.

Performers
Jason Navarro - vocals
Dan Lukacinsky - guitar, backing vocals
Royce Nunley - bass, backing vocals
Derek Grant - drums, hammond organ, clavinet, piano, backing vocals
Vinnie Nobile - trombone
Larry Klimas - tenor saxophone

Album information
Record label: Hollywood Records
Produced by Julian Raymond, Phil Kaffel, and The Suicide Machines
All songs written by The Suicide Machines except "I Don't Wanna Hear It" by Minor Threat
Recorded November–December 1995 by Phil Kaffel with assistance by Alex Reed and Krish Sharma
Mixed January 1996 at Conway Studios by Jerry Finn with assistance by Shawn O'Dwyer
Art direction by Todd Gallopo
Design by Todd Gallopo and The Suicide Machines
Lyrics drawn by Jef Petruczkowycz
Back cover art by Steve Toth
Photos by Bob Alford

References

The Suicide Machines albums
Hollywood Records albums
1996 debut albums
Albums produced by Julian Raymond